Vasilyevka is a rural locality (a village) in Stepanovskoye Rural Settlement, Kudymkarsky District, Perm Krai, Russia. The population was 1 as of 2010. There is 1 street.

Geography 
Vasilyevka is located 15 km southeast of Kudymkar (the district's administrative centre) by road. Ostapova is the nearest rural locality.

References 

Rural localities in Kudymkarsky District